Sherin Zada is a Pakistani journalist working for Hum News. He was previously associated with the Express News based in Swat Valley, and had also worked with The Express Tribune, an English Newspaper.
He is known for his work during Taliban period over control of Swat Valley Pakistan. As a professional journalist, he covered or wrote highest number of reports and stories in the Valley.

World Record 

He is the first journalist with World Record of skydiving (10,000 ft in the air) in Swat Valley Pakistan.  The Sky Tandem Skydiving jump event was organized in Swat by Pakistan Army in Swat Valley Pakistan.

He is the first journalist with PTC during this skydiving with broadcasting on the Express News Pakistan. He was not properly trained for this skydiving and only got 04 hours briefing from Mr Peter (UK trainer).

Abroad Coverage for TV 

When the first Pakistani female Malala Yousafzai from Pakistan was receiving the Nobel Peace Prize Sherin Zada got the opportunity to have the exclusive interview with Malala Yousafzai from Oslo, Norway.

Negotiator 

Negotiate the matter of release of the 32 Policemen captured by the Taliban, the negotiation were made with the Spokesman of the Swat Taliban and after 7 hours tough negotiation in 02 days. Even bend down for the sake of lives of the 32 Policemen and as outcome the 32 Policemen were safely released and were taken to their families in different part of the Country. This act was appreciated by the Policemen Department, Pakistan's Army, Local People, Civil Society and the national and international journalists.

Visits / Tours 

He visited recently the USA and the Europe more than a dozen countries of the world during 2015-2016, in the USA he visited many states and wrote about the Pakistanis working in the US, he also wrote about the American people.

He is also attached with Associated Press, he is one of the Notables in Swat. His work in videos can be seen at the link  Sherin Zada remained on various position in Swat Press Club including General Secretary (twice) and President Swat Union of Journalists.

Family 
His sons including Muhammad Abdullah Sherin (a journalist running an online news web-portal Swat Post), Abdur Rahman (Computer Expert and Graduate) and Shah Fahad (Student/Intermediate). He got four daughters including Ambareen Sherin, Ayesha Sherin, Javeria Sherin and Madheeha Sherin, he love the little one the most (Madheeha Sherin). His family include another journalist Sheraz Khan Bureau Chief at Swat Post.

Personal life 
During early days of his childhood he was founder cricketer and remained best batter and spin bowler at Super Star Cricket team in Swat valley.

During schooling he was fond of driving and was good divier at the age 13. He was also fond of fishing and photography in addition. He often spent days in summer at Swat River and was a traveler.

He also owns the online news web-portal Swat Post

Political career 

During the 90s he was the first founding member of Pakistan Tehrek-e-Insaf (PTI). He remained member of the Provincial Cabinet of the PTI from Swat district. He also remained President of PTI in Swat district.h

However he left the PTI and became a professional journalist.

Youtube - Silver Button receiver for 10 Million Subscribers 

Recently in December 2021 Sherin Zada received silver button for the 10 Million Subscribers on the YouTube.com, he is the first working/field journalist in KP province of Pakistan for the said award.

Lectures at Universities 

He had given lectures in various universities ie., University of Gujrat, Pakistan, University of Punjab, Pakistan in various national and international events abroad.

Lakes Discoveries as Trekker 

Sherin Zada discovered 30 Lakes in the Swat Valley and allied districts as trekker and had coverage for the different news channels.

Selected work

He also covered for the first time for the media/TV.

Snow Jeep Rally in Kalam Swat Valley
Lowari Top Snow Jeep Rally Report
Snowfall in Swat Valley Very Cold Weather Tourist Enjoy
Kalam Road Latest Condition 2016
Swat Highest Waterfall in Pakistan
Monte Bondone Ski resort, Trento, Italy
Lamchar Waterfall in Upper Dir
Kandol Lake, Swat Valley
Stopa, Swat Valley; Amluk Dara History of Buddha
Historical Fort in Swat Valley, Pakistan
Pashto Singer Gul Panra Interview
Malala Yousafzai Exclusive Interview with Sherin Zada after Nobel Peace Prize Ceremony in Oslo, Norway
Nobel Peace Prize Award Ceremony coverage for Express TV
Nobel Peace Prize Award Ceremony; Oslo, Norway
Malala Yousafzai Noble Peace Prize Celebrattion in Swat Valley, Pakistan
Malala Spent Her 17th Birthday In Nigeria - Report
Ghost Schools in Najigram, Swat Valley
Ghost Schools in Swat Valley, Pakistan
Education in Swat Pakistan Report
Environment and Natural Forests in Swat Valley, Pakistan
Nature's blessing: Apple Orchards at Risk Due to Negligence in Swat Valley

References

Running his own YouTube Channel, the link is: https://www.youtube.com/sherinzada

Living people
Pakistani male journalists
Year of birth missing (living people)